Willem Frederik van Eelen (4 July 1923 – 24 February 2015) was a Dutch researcher and businessperson, who pioneered the creation and development of cultured meat. He is recognized as one of the "godfathers of cultured meat".

Biography 
Van Eelen was born in the Dutch East Indies in 1923, the son of a doctor. He served in the army in Indonesia during the Second World War. Following the loss of the Dutch colony to the Japanese, Van Eelen was captured and spent the remainder of the war as a prisoner. His experiences of cruelty and hardship in multiple prisoner of war camps informed his later perception of the world.

Van Eelen studied psychology at the University of Amsterdam after the war and after attending a lecture on the preservation of meat, he came up with the idea of growing meat outside the body, in a laboratory. Van Eelen was not a vegetarian, but cared strongly about the way that animals are treated and felt that "[g]rowing meat without inflicting pain seemed a natural solution." Following his graduation, Van Eelen attended medical school where he connected with research scientists and biologists in the hope of developing his idea into reality. Van Eelen dropped out after one of his tutors said that if he was serious about his idea, he would need to raise money to fund research. He ran a succession of restaurants and art galleries, with his wife, and they saved whatever spare money they had, to put towards the development of his idea.

By the 1990s, with the help of several investors, Van Eelen raised . His first patent was filed in 1994, with several more following.

In 2014, Van Eelen suffered a stroke and was hospitalized. He died in 2015, at the age of 91.

References

Further reading 
 

1923 births
2015 deaths
20th-century Dutch businesspeople
20th-century Dutch East Indies people
20th-century Dutch inventors
Dutch people of the Dutch East Indies
Dutch prisoners of war in World War II
Royal Netherlands East Indies Army personnel of World War II
University of Amsterdam alumni